Trnovec is a village and municipality in Skalica District in the Trnava Region of western Slovakia.

History
In historical records the village was first mentioned in 1548.

Geography
The municipality lies at an altitude of 181 metres and covers an area of 2.528 km2. It has a population of about 316 people.

References

External links

 Official page
http://www.statistics.sk/mosmis/eng/run.html

Villages and municipalities in Skalica District